|}

The Curragh Cup is a Group 2 flat horse race in Ireland open to thoroughbreds aged three years or older. It is run at the Curragh over a distance of 1 mile and 6 furlongs (2,816 metres), and it is scheduled to take place each year in late June or early July.

The event was established in 1987, and for a period it was classed at Listed level. It was promoted to Group 3 status in 1994 and upgraded again to Group 2 status in 2016.

The race is part of the Curragh's three-day Irish Derby Festival meeting, and it is currently held on the first day. The Curragh Cup has been won by several top-class horses including Almaarad, Vintage Crop, Daliapour, Kastoria, Septimus, Red Cadeaux and Rekindling.

Records

Most successful horse (2 wins):
 Vintage Crop – 1993, 1995
 Mkuzi – 2004, 2005
 Ernest Hemingway - 2013, 2014
 Twilight Payment - 2019, 2020

Leading jockey (5 wins):
 Michael Kinane – Vintage Crop (1993, 1995), Daliapour (2002), Mkuzi (2004), Kastoria (2006)

Leading trainer (7 wins):
 Aidan O'Brien - Septimus (2008), Ernest Hemingway (2013, 2014), Bondi Beach (2015), Sword Fighter (2016), Flag Of Honour (2018), Amhran Na Bhfiann (2021)

Winners

See also
 Horse racing in Ireland
 List of Irish flat horse races

References

 Paris-Turf:

 Racing Post:

 galopp-sieger.de – Curragh Cup.
 horseracingintfed.com – International Federation of Horseracing Authorities – Curragh Cup (2018).
 irishracinggreats.com – Curragh Cup (Group 3).
 pedigreequery.com – Curragh Cup – Curragh.

Flat races in Ireland
Curragh Racecourse
Open long distance horse races
Recurring sporting events established in 1987
1987 establishments in Ireland